Assara aterpes is a species of snout moth in the genus Assara. It was described by Alfred Jefferis Turner and is found in Australia.

References

Moths described in 1913
Phycitini
Moths of Australia